Aya: Imagined Autobiography (tr. Aya: Autobiographia Dimionit) is a 1994 Israeli independent underground dramatic art film directed by Michal Bat-Adam. The titular character is the same one from the director's earlier film Boy Meets Girl, now haunted by her past.

Synopsis
The film presents the story of the filming of this fictional film while intersecting within it her dreams and delusions from her life and relations with her father , played inside the fictional film by ) and her mentally ill mother (played inside the fictional film by Levana Finkelstein). Aya sees her life as a striving to exist, namely, to do something important in life, both in her eyes and in her father's. However, while making this film, Aya understands that all of this striving for something large is pointless, and, that what really matters is the ability to experience every moment of life, finding meaning therein.

Reception
Writing in Haaretz, critic  opined that the film is director Michal Bat-Adam's best one so far, while Ha'ir critic Dr.  wrote that it was her most personal as well as her most interesting one to date. Time Out Tel Aviv critic  noted that watching this film "is like meeting for the first time someone who insists on telling you about a very intimate dream he had had, while exposing you to his unedited and private world of fantasies and associations." Abroad, Variety stated that, in this film, the "clash between film and reality is really the core of the movie, with scenes from the autobiographical film clashing with scenes from Aya’s memory. Sometimes the memory is harsher and sometimes the film is, as if Bat-Adam doesn’t trust either as a source of truth."

References

External links

Aya: Imagined Autobiography at the TCM Movie Database

1994 drama films
1994 independent films
1994 films
Films about diseases
Films about dreams
Films about families
Films about film directors and producers
Films about marriage
Films about mental health
Films directed by Michal Bat-Adam
Films set in Israel
Films shot in Israel
1990s Hebrew-language films
Israeli drama films
Israeli independent films
Self-reflexive films